Fabrizio Castori (born 11 July 1954) is an Italian football coach. He is currently in charge of  club Perugia.

Career 
Castori was born in San Severino Marche, but grew up in Tolentino. He started his coaching career in 1980 at the age of 26 as head coach of Seconda Categoria team Belfortese from Belforte del Chienti. Initially a boss for amateur teams, having spent three seasons in Seconda Categoria (second-lowest division in Italian football) and three others in Prima Categoria, he led a Promozione team, Cerreto, to reach Serie D in 1990 (there was no Eccellenza division at that time). From 1992 to 1998 Castori coached Eccellenza team Tolentino leading them to Serie C2. 
In 1998-1999 he won a Serie D league and a Scudetto Dilettanti with Lanciano. After a poor Serie C1 season with Castel di Sangro, he returned at Lanciano in 2000, and immediately won the Serie C2 league. He stayed at Lanciano until 2003.

Cesena 

In the summer 2003 he was appointed head coach of Serie C1 team Cesena. At his first season, he led Cesena to win the promotion playoffs and the Coppa Italia Serie C; this however was obscured by a 3-year ban on him after having been protagonist of a riot during the return leg of the promotion playoff finals against Lumezzane. The ban was successively reduced to 2 years following a pardon request by Castori himself; during this time, Castori was unable to serve as head coach but, despite this, he was confirmed as Cesena's boss, with assistant manager Massimo Gadda serving at his place on the dugout until 23 January 2006.

On 11 November 2007, following a 1–4 loss to Rimini in a regional derby and only seven points gained in the first fourteen matches, Castori was dismissed by Cesena, after four seasons at the helm of the bianconeri, but was reinstated at his managing role only three months later following Giovanni Vavassori's dismissal on 25 February 2008; his comeback at Cesena proved however to be unsuccessful, as the bianconeri were relegated to Serie C1 at the end of the season.

Salernitana 

Castori served the 2008–09 season as head coach of newly promoted Serie B team Salernitana. He was successively sacked later in December, to be replaced by Bortolo Mutti, and then re-called on February, only to be dismissed again on April and replaced by Fabio Brini, who guided the club to safety.

Piacenza 

He was then appointed in June 2009 as new head coach of Piacenza for the upcoming 2009–10 Serie B season, being however dismissed in November due to poor results.

Ascoli 

On 3 November 2010 he returned into management as head coach of Serie B relegation-threatened club Ascoli. On 2 November 2011 he was sacked because of bad results. Ascoli is currently last in Serie B.

Varese 

Since 12 June 2012 he is the new head coach of Varese in Serie B.

Reggina 

From October 2013 until December 2013 he had a brief stint as manager of Reggina in Serie B.

Carpi 

On 30 June 2014, Castori was announced as the new manager of Serie B team Carpi, on a one-year deal. He started his Carpi experience in a hugely successful way, leading the small outsider club top of the league table by the end of the first season half and turning them into strong contenders to a historical first Serie A promotion. He was relieved of his duties on 28 September 2015. He was reinstated as manager a month later on 3 November 2015. He was successively recalled to attempt to escape the club from relegation, which he failed on the final weekday of the season.

He was confirmed as Carpi boss for the 2016–17 Serie B season, which ended with the club narrowly missing a top flight return, being defeated by Benevento in the promotion playoff finals; he left Carpi by mutual consent successively.

Back to Cesena
On 1 October 2017 he accepted to move back to Cesena, taking over at the bottom of the Serie B league with the goal to save the club from relegation. In July 2018 the club was declared bankrupt and banned from participating in the Serie B.

Third stint at Carpi 
On 18 September 2018 he was signed by Carpi, making his second return to the club. The team was relegated to Serie C at the end of the 2018–19 season and he departed from the club.

Trapani
On 19 December 2019 he signed with Serie B club Trapani.

Second stint at Salernitana
After one season at Trapani, he left for fellow Serie B club Salernitana. Under his tenure, the Campanians completed the season in second place, winning direct promotion to Serie A.

Castori guided Salernitana for the first eight games of the 2021–22 Serie A season, being relieved from his duties on 17 October following a 1–2 loss to Spezia which left the Granata at the bottom of the league table.

Perugia 
On 8 June 2022, Castori returned into management as the new head coach of Serie B club Perugia, replacing Massimiliano Alvini. He was dismissed on 19 September 2022 following a dismal start in the 2022–23 Serie B campaign.

On 19 October 2022, following the resignations of his replacement Silvio Baldini, Castori was called back in charge of Perugia.

Managerial statistics

References

1954 births
Living people
Sportspeople from the Province of Macerata
Italian football managers
A.C. Cesena managers
U.S. Salernitana 1919 managers
Piacenza Calcio 1919 managers
Ascoli Calcio 1898 F.C. managers
A.C. Carpi managers
A.C. Perugia Calcio managers
Serie A managers
Serie B managers
Serie C managers